Miłki  is a village in Giżycko County, Warmian-Masurian Voivodeship, in northern Poland. It is the seat of the gmina (administrative district) called Gmina Miłki.

The village has a population of 580.

Notable residents
 Joachim Kaiser (1928−2017), German music, literature and theatre critic

References

Villages in Giżycko County